The Maritime Frontier or Coastal Borderland was an area corresponding to the Senj great captaincy and Otočac captaincy of the Croatian Military Frontier, divided physically from it by the Kapela mountain massif (thus its separation). The seat of the frontier was in Senj, and it was organized into the Karlovac Generalat. It also had some exclaves, such as on Trsat.

References

Sources

Military history of Croatia
History of Dalmatia
Military Frontier
17th-century military history of Croatia